The Journal of Human Hypertension is a monthly peer-reviewed medical journal covering research into hypertension. It was established in 1987 and is published by Nature Publishing Group. The editor-in-chief is Michael Stowasser (University of Queensland). According to the Journal Citation Reports, the journal had a 2020 impact factor of 3.012, ranking it 33rd out of 65 journals in the category "Peripheral Vascular Disease".

References

External links

Hypertension journals
Monthly journals
Nature Research academic journals
Publications established in 1987
English-language journals